The men's decathlon at the 2010 European Athletics Championships was held at the Estadi Olímpic Lluís Companys on 28 and 29 July.

Medalists

Records

Schedule

Results

100 metres

Heat 1

Heat 2

Heat 3

Long jump

Shot put

High jump

400 metres

Heat 1

Heat 2

Heat 3

Heat 4

110 metres hurdles

Heat 1

Heat 2

Heat 3

Discus throw

Pole vault

Javelin throw

1500 metres

Heat 1

Heat 2

Final standings

References
 Participants list
100m Results
Long Jump Results
Shot Put Results
High Jump Results
400m Results
110m hurdles
Discus throw Results
Pole vault Results
Javelin throw Results
1500m Results
Final standings

Decathlon
Combined events at the European Athletics Championships